Emmanuel Ekong (born 25 June 2002) is a professional footballer who plays as a forward for Perugia, on loan from Empoli. Born in Italy to Nigerian parents, he is a Sweden youth international.

Club career
As a youth player, Ekong joined the youth academy of Swedish seventh tier side Bollstanäs SK. in 2015, he joined the youth academy of IF Brommapojkarna in the Swedish second tier.

In 2018, he joined the youth academy of Italian Serie A club Empoli. On 5 September 2022, Ekong debuted for Empoli during a 2–2 draw with Salernitana.

In January 2023, Ekong signed for Serie B club Perugia on loan until the end of the season.

International career
Born in Italy to Nigerian parents and raised in Sweden, Ekong is eligible to represent three national teams. He has represented the Sweden U19 team five times, scoring one goal.

Personal life
Ekong is the son of Nigeria international Prince Ikpe Ekong.

References

External links
 
 Svenskfotboll profile

Living people
2002 births
Sportspeople from Reggio Emilia
Swedish footballers
Sweden youth international footballers
Italian footballers
Swedish people of Nigerian descent
Italian people of Nigerian descent
Italian emigrants to Sweden
Association football forwards
Serie A players
Empoli F.C. players
A.C. Perugia Calcio players